Akota is one of the 182 assembly constituencies of Gujarat. It is located in Vadodara district. This seat came into existence after 2008 delimitation.

List of segments
This assembly seat represents the following segments,

 Vadodara Taluka (Part) – Vadodara Municipal Corporation (Part) Ward No. – 5, 6

Members of Legislative Assembly

Election results

2022

2017

2012

See also
 List of constituencies of the Gujarat Legislative Assembly
 Vadodara district
 Gujarat Legislative Assembly

References

External links
 

Assembly constituencies of Gujarat
Vadodara district